Appolena was a town of ancient Phrygia, inhabited during Roman and Byzantine times. Its name does not occur in ancient authors, but is inferred from epigraphic and other evidence.

Its site is located near Tezkalesi in Anatolia.

References

Populated places in Phrygia
Former populated places in Turkey
Roman towns and cities in Turkey
Populated places of the Byzantine Empire
History of Afyonkarahisar Province